Agrotis psammophaea is a moth of the family Noctuidae. It was first described by Edward Meyrick in 1899. It is endemic to the Hawaiian islands of Kauai, Oahu, Maui, and Hawaii.

External links

Nishida, Gordon C. (2002). Hawaiian Terrestrial Arthropod Checklist. Fourth Edition. Bishop Museum, Honolulu.  

Agrotis
Endemic moths of Hawaii
Moths described in 1899